Babi Island (literally Pig Island) is an island located off the coast of Flores, East Nusa Tenggara. The 1992 Flores earthquake and tsunami are estimated to have killed 263 to 700 residents of the island, with most of the destruction on the southern end of the island.

Layout
Its north end is bordered by a wide coral reef and faces the Flores Sea. Further south there is a small tidal flat where two villages were built, the majority-Christian Pagaraman to the east and majority-Muslim Kampungbaru to the west. At the southern end of the island, the barrier reef tapers. It is administratively part of Sikka Regency, East Nusa Tenggara.

History
On 12 December 1992, an earthquake occurred near Flores at 5:29 a.m. local time (UTC+8). Within three minutes, at least one tsunami approached Babi Island from the direction of the earthquake's epicenter to the north, while a second may have hit the southwest side of the island after refracting around the southern side. Between 263 and 700 of the island's 1,093 inhabitants were killed and both villages were completely destroyed.

Diving
Babi is home to many diving sites. One, called The Crack, was formed during the 1992 earthquake. Numerous forms of aquatic life, including eagle rays, hammerhead sharks, and spider crabs can be found there. This spot also becomes one of the favorite place for travelers spend their time on snorkeling and diving.

Footnotes

Bibliography

 
 
 
 

Lesser Sunda Islands
Landforms of Flores Island (Indonesia)
Landforms of East Nusa Tenggara
Populated places in Indonesia
Islands of Indonesia